John Letts and Peter Lundgren were the defending champions, but Letts did not participate this year.  Lundgren partnered Jeremy Bates, losing in the quarterfinals.

Gilad Bloom and Shahar Perkiss won the title, defeating Wolfgang Popp and Huub van Boeckel 6–2, 6–4 in the final.

Seeds

  Brian Levine /  Christo Steyn (semifinals)
  Ronnie Båthman /  Andrew Castle (first round)
  Brad Gilbert /  Amos Mansdorf (first round)
  Wolfgang Popp /  Huub van Boeckel (final)

Draw

Draw

External links
Draw

Tel Aviv Open
1987 Grand Prix (tennis)